Mary Chadwick (died 1943) was a British nurse and psychoanalyst, characterized by Edward Glover as "the founder of child-analysis in Britain". A friend of the poet H. D., she analysed H.D. in 1931.

Life
Chadwick was introduced to psychotherapy by the Medico-Psychological Clinic, receiving her first analysis there from Julia Turner. She delivered a paper on child analysis to the inaugural British Psychoanalytic Society meeting in 1919. In 1920 she accompanied James Strachey, Edward Glover and Ella Freeman Sharpe to Berlin, where she underwent analysis with Hanns Sachs. She started seeing children in therapy in 1922, and became an Associate Member of the BPAS in 1923.

In the mid-1920s Chadwick wrote a pair of essays on the sexual motivations underlying curiosity, characterizing the male will to know as envious of the female ability to give birth. Her argument here influenced Melanie Klein, who later also reviewed Chadwick's book on menstruation.<ref>Melanie Klein, 'Review of 'Women's Periodicity ', 1933.</ref>

In 1930 Chadwick befriended the poet H.D., the novelist Bryher and the filmmaker Kenneth Macpherson. H.D., Bryher and MacPherson collaborated in film production as the Pool Group, and Chadwick wrote for their magazine, Close Up, in 1931. Bryher paid for both Kenneth Macpherson and H.D. to go into analysis with Chadwick. H.D. saw Chadwick for 24 sessions, from April to July 1931, before ending analysis abruptly. She found Chadwick's mixing of analysis and friendship distressing, and seems to have associated her with 'sadism'. By comparison with Hanns Sachs, with whom H.D. entered analysis at the end of the year, H.D. also felt Chadwick was hampered by an English moralism:

Chadwick died suddenly in May 1943.

Works
 'A Case of Kleptomania in a Girl of Ten Years', International Journal of Psycho-Analysis, Vol. 6 (1925), pp. 300–312
 'Über die Wurzel der Wissbegierde' [On the origin of curiosity], Internationale Zeitschrift für Psychoanalyse, Vol. 11 (1925), pp. 54–68
 'Notes upon the Acquisition of Knowledge', Psychoanalytic Review, Vol. 13 (1926), pp. 257–80
 'Ein Experiment in einem Kindergarten', Zeitschrift für psychoanalytische Pädagogik, Vol. 1, No. 11-12 (1927), pp. 350–357.
 'Die Gott-Phantasie bei Kindern', Imago, Vol. 13 (1927), pp. 383–394
 Difficulties in child development. London: G. Allen & Unwin, Ltd, 1928.
 'Die Unterscheidung zwischen Ton und Sprache in der frühen Kindheit', Zeitschrift für psychoanalytische Pädagogik, Vol. 2 (1928), pp. 369–83.
 'Notes upon the Fear of Death', International Journal of Psycho-Analysis, Vol. 10 (1929), pp. 321–34
 'Die Erziehung der Erzieher' [The education of the educators], Zeitschrift für psychoanalytische Pädagogik, Vol. 4 (1930), pp. 356–370
 Nursing Psychological Patients. London, 1931.
 'Menstruationsangst', Zeitschrift für psychoanalytische Pädagogik, Vol. 5 (1931), pp. 184–189
 'My First Sound Film', Close Up, Vol. 8. No. 1, 1931
 The Psychological Effects of Menstruation. New York: Nervous and Mental Disease Pub. Co., 1932.
 Adolescent Girlhood. London: G. Allen & Unwin Ltd., 1932.
 Women's Periodicity. London, 1933
 Chapters about Childhood. The Psychology of Children from 5-10 Years. London, 1939.
 The Toddler in the Home''. London, 1940.

References

External links
 Mary Chadwick

Year of birth missing
1943 deaths
English nurses
British psychoanalysts